Júlia Daltoé Lordes (born 24 November 2001), known as Júlia Daltoé or just Júlia, is a Brazilian footballer who plays as a midfielder for Santos FC.

Club career
Born in Encantado, Rio Grande do Sul, Júlia joined Chapecoense's at the age of 12. She first appeared with the main squad in 2016, aged only 15, and moved to Internacional in 2017, initially for the youth setup.

Júlia started to feature in the first team of Inter during the 2018 campaign, helping in the club's promotion to the Campeonato Brasileiro Série A1 at the end of the season. In February 2021, she moved to Santos FC.

References

2001 births
Living people
Sportspeople from Rio Grande do Sul
Brazilian women's footballers
Women's association football midfielders
Campeonato Brasileiro de Futebol Feminino Série A1 players
Santos FC (women) players
Sport Club Internacional (women) players